1093 is the natural number following 1092 and preceding 1094.

1093 is a prime number. Together with 1091 and 1097, it forms a prime triplet. It is a happy prime and a star prime. It is also the smallest Wieferich prime. 1093 is a repunit prime in base 3 because:

References
 Die Welt der Primzahlen p. 237
  p. 240
 Meine Zahlen, meine Freunde p. 223
 The Number 1093
 Number Gossip: 1093
 Prime Curios!: 1093

Integers